The Caesar cut is a hairstyle with short, horizontally straight cut bangs. The hair is layered to around 2–5 cm (1-2 inches) all over. It is named after the Roman Emperor Tiberius Caesar Augustus, whose images frequently depict him wearing his hair in such a manner. This haircut first became fashionable among Western boys and men in the 1950s.

In recent times, a prominent user has been the founder and CEO of Facebook, Mark Zuckerberg.

See also 
 Roman hairstyles
 List of hairstyles

References

Additional sources 

 From Abba to Zoom: A Pop Culture Encyclopedia of the Late 20th Century

External links

Hairstyles
1990s fashion
Ancient Rome in art and culture
Tiberius